The 2014 Ukraine train bus collision occurred on 4 February 2014 when a bus was hit by a train and killed at least 13 people and another 6 were wounded; the bus driver survived. According to province prosecutor's office: "The shuttle bus ignored the traffic lights and the sound signals and headed to the crossing".

See also
Marhanets train accident
List of rail accidents (2010–present)
List of road accidents (2010–present)
List of countries by traffic-related death rate

References

2014 in Ukraine
2014 road incidents
Railway accidents in 2014
Bus incidents in Ukraine
Level crossing incidents in Ukraine
History of Sumy Oblast
February 2014 events in Europe
2014 disasters in Ukraine